"Fall Creek Boys Choir" is a song by James Blake and Bon Iver, released as the first single from Blake's Enough Thunder EP. The song was premiered on BBC Radio 1 and released on the internet on August 24, 2011. It was released commercially as a single on August 29, 2011. The song extensively uses multi-layered vocals, auto-tune and vocoders.

The song's title is a reference to Fall Creek, Wisconsin, where Justin Vernon, Bon Iver's frontman, owns the recording studio April Base Studios.

Critical reception
Steve Horowitz of PopMatters praised the song and gave it eight out of ten stars, stating, "The two work in completely different genres. Blake and dubstep has its roots in urban electronic dance music. Bon Iver’s recordings show an affinity for rural folk traditions and harmony vocalizations that recall the open air of his remote Wisconsin home. But the results are in with a single called "Fall Creek Boys Choir" that sounds like someone welded the two sounds together with a blow torch. That's a compliment. While the Frankenstein-style creation may not resemble the pure music of each other's past, it lives and breathes."

Track listing

References

External links 
 

2011 singles
James Blake (musician) songs
Bon Iver songs
Polydor Records singles
Songs written by Justin Vernon
2011 songs
Songs written by James Blake (musician)